Toril, meaning bullpen in Spanish, may refer to:

Philippines
 Toril, a district of Davao City in the Philippines
 Toril, a barangay in Samal, Davao del Norte, Philippines
 Turil or Toril, a barangay or village in the municipality of Maribojoc, Bohol province in the Central Visayas region of the Philippines

Spain
 Toril, Cáceres, a municipality in Extremadura, Spain
 Toril y Masegoso, a municipality in the province of Teruel, Aragon, Spain

Other uses
 TorilMUD, a 1996 online game
 Alberto Toril (born 1973), Spanish footballer and coach
 Abeir-Toril, a fictional planet in the Dungeons & Dragons universe

See also
Torill, a Norwegian given name also written as Toril